Lakhnewala Halt railway station 
() is  located in Lakhnewala, Mandi Bahauddin district Pakistan.

See also
 List of railway stations in Pakistan
 Pakistan Railways

References

External links

Railway stations in Mandi Bahauddin District